Kwai Shing West Estate is a public housing estate in Kwai Shing, Kwai Chung, New Territories, Hong Kong located at the east of Kwai Shing East Estate. It consists of ten residential blocks completed between 1975 and 1977.

Houses

Demographics
According to the 2016 by-census, Kwai Shing West Estate had a population of 13,720. The median age was 46.1 and the majority of residents (97 per cent) were of Chinese ethnicity. The average household size was 2.7 people. The median monthly household income of all households (i.e. including both economically active and inactive households) was HK$21,500.

Politics
Kwai Shing West Estate is located in Kwai Shing West Estate constituency of the Kwai Tsing District Council. It is currently represented by Ivy Leung Ching-shan, who was elected in the 2019 elections.

See also

Public housing estates in Kwai Chung

References

Residential buildings completed in 1975
Residential buildings completed in 1976
Residential buildings completed in 1977
Kwai Shing
Kwai Chung
Public housing estates in Hong Kong